North Rhine-Westphalia is home to 14 universities and over 50 partly postgraduate colleges, with a total of over 500,000 students. Largest and oldest university is the University of Cologne (Universität zu Köln), founded in 1388 AD.

List of universities and colleges

 the RWTH Aachen University
 the University of Bielefeld
 the University of Bochum
 the University of Bonn
 the University of Cologne
 the German Sport University Cologne
 the TU Dortmund University
 the University of Duisburg-Essen
 the University of Düsseldorf
 the FernUniversität Hagen
 the University of Münster
 the University of Paderborn
 the University of Siegen
 the Witten/Herdecke University
 the University of Wuppertal

References

 
North Rhine-Westphalia